Wakeshma Township is a civil township of Kalamazoo County in the U.S. state of Michigan. The 2010 census recorded a population of 1,301, down from 1,414 at the 2000 census.

Communities
It is the only population center in the township. The Fulton area ZIP code is 49052 and serves the eastern and southern portion of the township as well as a portion of southeast Climax Township and western Athens Township in Calhoun County.

Fulton is the site of the headquarters of the federally recognized Nottawaseppi Huron Band of Potawatomi. The Band has a reservation near here and jurisdiction over tribal members in neighboring counties.

Geography
Little Portage Creek and Bear Creek flow through the township.

Adjacent townships in Kalamazoo County are: Brady (west), Pavilion (northwest) and Climax (north). In Calhoun County: Leroy (northeast) and Athens (east). In Branch County: Sherwood (southeast). In St. Joseph County: Leonidas (south) and Mendon (southwest).

Demographics
As of the census of 2000, there were 1,414 people, 486 households, and 402 families residing in the township. There were 502 housing units at an average density of 13.9 per square mile (5.4/km). The racial makeup of the township was 97.60% White, 0.50% African American, 0.07% Native American, 0.35% Asian, 0.64% from other races, and 0.85% from two or more races. Hispanic or Latino of any race were 0.64% of the population.

There were 486 households, out of which 40.7% had children under the age of 18 living with them, 69.8% were married couples living together, 7.8% had a female householder with no husband present, and 17.1% were non-families. 13.6% of all households were made up of individuals, and 4.5% had someone living alone who was 65 years of age or older.  The average household size was 2.88 and the average family size was 3.14.

In the township the population was spread out, with 28.8% under the age of 18, 6.6% from 18 to 24, 30.6% from 25 to 44, 23.8% from 45 to 64, and 10.3% who were 65 years of age or older.  The median age was 36 years. For every 100 females, there were 107.0 males.  For every 100 females age 18 and over, there were 108.1 males.

The median income for a household in the township was $52,328, and the median income for a family was $53,264. Males had a median income of $36,739 versus $27,292 for females. The per capita income for the township was $20,051.  About 7.3% of families and 8.7% of the population were below the poverty line, including 13.2% of those under age 18 and 8.3% of those age 65 or over.

References

External links
Official website

Townships in Kalamazoo County, Michigan
Kalamazoo–Portage metropolitan area
Townships in Michigan